Pizza 73 is a Canadian pizza restaurant chain.

Pizza 73 has 89 locations in Alberta, British Columbia, Saskatchewan, and Yukon. The restaurant's name originates from its original phone number: 473–7373. Founded by David Tougas and Guy Goodwin in 1985, Pizza 73 is headquartered in Edmonton, Alberta.

Pizza 73 was the first delivery chain in Alberta to have a centralized call center, allowing customers to order their meals by phone; Pizza 73 has facilitated orders online since 1995. The restaurant has been recognized as one of Canada's 50 best-managed services, and one of Alberta's 50 fastest-growing companies by Alberta Venture.

References

External links

Companies based in Edmonton
Pizza chains of Canada
Pizza Pizza
Regional restaurant chains in Canada
Restaurants established in 1985
1985 establishments in Alberta
2007 mergers and acquisitions